Francesco Morosini or simply Morosini has been the name of at least five ships of the Italian Navy, named in honour of Francesco Morosini:
 , an ironclad battleship completed in 1889 and stricken in 1909
 Italian battleship Francesco Morosini, a  laid down in 1915 and broken up on slip in 1921.
 , a  launched in 1938 and sunk in 1942.
 , a  launched in 1944 as USS Besugo. Loaned to Italy between 1966 and 1975 after which she was returned to the United States Navy.
 , a  launched in 2020

Italian Navy ship names